St. Mary's Senior Secondary School is a private Catholic secondary school for girls in Maligaon, Guwahati, Assam, India. It is operated by the Salesian Sisters of Don Bosco. It is recognized by the Central Board of Secondary Education.

History
The school was established 10 January 1966 as a primary school affiliated with St. Mary's School in Guwahati. In 1988 the school began expanding to include a secondary school. It became a proper high school in 1991.

References

External links

Salesian secondary schools
Catholic secondary schools in India
High schools and secondary schools in Assam
Schools in Guwahati
Christian schools in Assam
1966 establishments in Assam
Educational institutions established in 1966